George Barton (8 June 1808 – 20 June 1864) was an English cricketer. Barton was a right-handed batsman.  He was born at Dartford, Kent.

Barton made his first-class debut for Sussex against the Marylebone Cricket Club in 1835 at the Royal New Ground, Brighton. He next appeared in first-class cricket for Sussex in 1836 against Kent, before playing the same opposition again in 1838.  In 1839, he appeared in a single first-class match for the Gentlemen of Sussex against the Marylebone Cricket Club, as well as playing in that season for the newly formed Sussex County Cricket Club in its second first-class match, which came against England.  Barton played first-class cricket for Sussex until 1856, making a further 30 first-class appearances for the County Cricket Club, the last of which came against Kent County Cricket Club in 1856.  In total, Barton played 34 first-class matches for Sussex, before and after the county club's formation, scoring 359 runs at an average of 6.90, with a high score of 34.  During his career, he also played a single first-class match each for the Gentlemen against the Players and for the South against the North.

He died at Uckfield, Sussex on 20 June 1864.

References

External links
George Barton at ESPNcricinfo
George Barton at CricketArchive

1808 births
1864 deaths
Sportspeople from Dartford
English cricketers
Sussex cricketers
Gentlemen cricketers
North v South cricketers
English cricketers of 1826 to 1863
Gentlemen of Sussex cricketers